Ahmed El-Leithy (born 1945) was appointed Minister of Agriculture and Land Reclamation of Egypt in Nazif's first Cabinet in 2004.

Biography
He replaced Yousef Wali in Nazif's new cabinet which was  formed on July 9, 2004. He was chosen as governor of the International Fund for Agricultural Development in 2005.

El-Leithy was replaced by businessman Amin Ahmed Mohamed Othman Abaza, a major player in the cotton industry, in Nazif's second Cabinet, which sworn in on Saturday, December 31, 2005. The replacement came among the appointment of a number of prominent business figures to set the wheels of economic reform in motion.

References

Agriculture Ministers of Egypt
1945 births
Living people
International Fund for Agricultural Development people
Egyptian officials of the United Nations